Used by Sumerians and other Mesopotamian cultures beginning in the third millennium BC, clay nails, also referred to as dedication or foundation pegs, cones, or nails, were cone-shaped nails made of clay, inscribed with cuneiform, baked, and stuck into the mudbrick walls to serve as evidence that the temple or building was the divine property of the god to whom it was dedicated.  Versions were also made of metal, including castings with figurative designs, such as the Hurrian foundation pegs (Syria, c. 2300 – c. 2159 BCE).

Additionally, uninscribed clay cones painted in different colors were used by Sumerians to create decorative mosaic patterns on walls and pillars of buildings, which also offered some protection against weathering.

The similar funerary cones of ancient Egypt used the cone base as the major writing surface.

Foundation nail examples

As some of the oldest 'documents' in history, the sponsor, responsible for the construction, or dedication of a work, some of the oldest histories, and/or intrigues are recorded. (Boasting sometimes led to historical inaccuracies, or misstatements of facts.)

King Entemena
King Entemena's nail is a prime example of a clay nail in excellent condition, as well as a detailed story. He was king of Lagash towards the late-middle of the 3rd millennium BC.

King Hammurabi
One of King Hammurabi's clay nails was acquired in March 1938 from an antique dealer. The nail, although fully preserved, is missing almost the entire shaft. The head has a diameter of 187 millimeters. In comparison, the shaft at the base is 110 millimeters in diameter. Both the head and shaft are inscribed with cuneiform writing in Akkadian. There are three columns of text on the head of the nail; the first column on the upper half having dulled over the course of centuries, and the lower half of the third column broken off. The clay nail bears the number A 24645 at the Oriental Institute, the University of Chicago's archaeology museum.

There are two replicas of the clay nail with the same inscription located at the University of Pennsylvania Museum and the Oxford Museum. However, each were transliterated and translated differently. The Philadelphia version is filled with missing text, although the complication was solved with the help of the Chicago version. Simultaneously, the Oxford text gives the Sumerian version. All three clay nails are now preserved in each of their respected locations. They are easily recognized to be from the Hammurabi period due to their distinct style of having a mushroom shape, broad heads, and short shafts.

See also

Funerary cone - (ancient Egyptian)

References

Mesopotamian religion
Cuneiform
Archaeology of the Near East
Ancient Near East art and architecture
Archaeological artefact types
Ancient Near and Middle East clay objects
3rd-millennium BC works